The Other Bank is a 2009 Georgian drama film directed by Giorgi Ovashvili. It was Georgia's submission to the 82nd Academy Award for the Academy Award for Best Foreign Language Film. It won best film award in 11th Dhaka International Film Festival.

References

External links 

2009 films
2009 drama films
Drama films from Georgia (country)
Abkhazia
Media Wave Award winners
Films directed by Giorgi Ovashvili